Angie Kate Cunningham (2 February 1973 – 4 October 2016) was a professional tennis player from Australia. She competed during her career under her maiden name Angie Woolcock.

Biography

Tennis career
Born in Launceston, Cunningham won the Pardey Shield tennis title at the age of 13, which made her the youngest winner of the prestigious Tasmanian schools competition. Soon after, she moved to Melbourne to pursue a career in tennis and was accepted into the Australian Institute of Sport in Canberra.

Cunningham was runner-up in three junior Grand Slam doubles finals, twice at the Australian Open and once at Wimbledon. She partnered with Nicole Pratt to make the final of the 1989 Australian Open, then in 1991 was a finalist again, with Joanne Limmer. Later in 1991, after beating Limmer to win her first ITF tournament in Woking, England, she partnered with the same player to reach the girls' doubles final at Wimbledon. She reached a highest junior doubles ranking of two in the world.

As a professional tennis player, she competed primarily in doubles. Her best performance on the WTA Tour was a semifinal appearance partnering Jo-Anne Faull at the Malaysian Women's Open in 1993. With a career best doubles ranking of 111 in 1993, she competed in the women's doubles main draws at all four grand slam tournaments that year. In 1994, she won two ITF singles titles, at Lee on Solent and Ballarat.

Retiring from tennis in 1996, Cunningham studied for a business degree at La Trobe University, then in 2000 began working for the Women's Tennis Association, through which she was based in London. Her roles during her ten year career at the WTA included being the Vice President of Player Relations and On-Site Operations.

Personal life and illness
Cunningham was the middle of three children born to Bill and Susie Woolcock. Her father ran local real estate company Woolcock Partners for 40 years, before it was bought by her elder brother Sam in 2013. She had a husband Pat and two daughters.

In 2012, she was diagnosed with motor neurone disease (MND). She died on 4 October 2016 at her home in Melbourne, at the age of 43. Her death occurred three and a half years after that of Australian tennis player Brad Drewett and a year before another former Australian player Peter Doohan died, both from motor neurone disease.

Honours
At the 2016 Newcombe Medal awards ceremony, she posthumously received the President's Spirit of Tennis Award for her efforts to raise awareness of MND.

The trophy for the Hobart International is named the Angie Cunningham Trophy in her honour.

ITF finals

Singles (3–3)

Doubles (7–6)

References

External links
 
 

1973 births
2016 deaths
Australian female tennis players
Tennis people from Tasmania
Sportspeople from Launceston, Tasmania
Sportswomen from Tasmania
Australian Institute of Sport tennis players
La Trobe University alumni
Neurological disease deaths in Victoria (Australia)
Deaths from motor neuron disease
20th-century Australian women